Great White Hope is a phrase that was coined by writer Jack London to describe James J. Jeffries before his prizefight with heavyweight champion Jack Johnson. The same label was sometimes applied to other boxers after Jeffries, including:

 Jess Willard (1881-1968), American boxer
 William Warren Barbour (1888–1943), American amateur boxer
 Luther McCarty (1892–1913)), American boxer
 Jerry Quarry (1945-1999), American boxer
 Gerry Cooney (born 1956), American boxer
 Willie de Wit (born 1961), Canadian boxer
 Tommy Morrison (1969–2013), American boxer

It may also refer to:

 The Great White Hope, a 1967 play by Howard Sackler
 The Great White Hope (film), a 1970 motion picture adapted from the play
 "Great White Hope", a 1978 rock song by Styx on the album Pieces of Eight

See also
 The Great White Hype, 1996 U.S. boxing sports-comedy film
 World White Heavyweight Championship, boxing title in pretense from 1911 to 1914
 The White Hope (disambiguation)
 Great White (disambiguation)

References

Nicknames
Nicknames in boxing
Nicknames in basketball